The Poet is a 1956 Soviet drama film directed by Boris Barnet.

Plot 
The film takes place during the Civil War in the port city, which organizes poetic evenings. Two local poets successfully perform there. One of them later joins the white army and the other - red.

Cast 
 Nikolay Kryuchkov as Nikolai Tzarev, communist leader
 Izolda Izvitskaya as Olga, communist agent
 Sergey Dvoretskiy as Nikolai Tarasov, communist poet (as S. Dvorzhetsky)
 Zoya Fyodorova as Katherine Tarasova, mother of Nikolai (as Z. Fyodorova)
 I. Kolin as Pharmacist
 Olga Vikland as Pharmacist's wife
 Pyotr Aleynikov as Stepan - Red Army soldier
 Vsevolod Larionov as Sergei Orlovsky - anti-communist
 Georgiy Georgiu as Father Orlovsky
 Ivan Koval-Samborsky as Colonel
 Vera Altayskaya as Secretary
 Pyotr Berezov as Artist
 Valentin Gaft as French soldier
 Tatyana Guretskaya as Communist agent
 Rina Zelyonaya as Poet

References

External links 
 

1956 films
1950s Russian-language films
Soviet drama films
1956 drama films
Soviet black-and-white films